Stockholm Free World Forum (Swedish: Frivärld) is a foreign policy think tank centered in Stockholm, Sweden. It was founded in 2011 by Mats Johansson, and is since January 2015 headed by Katarina Tracz.It has since its inception ranked among the most influential in Sweden, being commonly cited by numeros national and international news papers. Among its associates are Anders Åslund, Patrik Oksanen and Benjamin Katzeff Silberstein. It has also featured articles and books by senior Swedish dignitaries including former foreign minister Ann Linde, current prime minister Ulf Kristersson and current defence minister Pål Jonson among other senior staff. 

Notes and references

External links

Think tanks established in 2011
Think tanks based in Sweden
2011 establishments in Sweden